The 1996 BPR 4 Hours of Nürburgring, also known as the DMC/ADAC Rundstrecken Rennen, was the fifth race of the 1996 BPR Global GT Series.  It was run at the Nürburgring on 30 June 1996.

Official results
Class winners in bold.  Cars failing to complete 75% of winner's distance marked as Not Classified (NC).

Statistics
 Pole Position – #22 Lotus Racing Team – 1:37.070
 Fastest Lap – #28 Ennea Igol – 1:38.270

External links
 Race Results

1996 in the BPR Global GT Series
1996 in German motorsport